James Robert Beddome (born October 2, 1983) is a Canadian politician, and the leader of the Green Party of Manitoba. He has run in several elections for the provincial party, and was also the Green Party of Canada candidate in Winnipeg South Centre for the 2019 federal election. He works as lawyer in Manitoba.

Early life and career

Beddome was born in Brandon, Manitoba, and was raised on a livestock farm north of Rapid City. He has an Honours Bachelor of Arts degree in Political Studies and Economics from the University of Manitoba (2006), and has worked as an administrator at Nesbitt Burns.  In 2008, he and two partners started a bicycle taxi service in Winnipeg.

Beddome joined the Green Party of Manitoba in 2006, and soon became the chair of its economic policy committee. He worked on Kaj Hasselriis's campaign for Mayor of Winnipeg in 2006, and stood as the Green candidate for the rural division of Minnedosa in the 2007 provincial election. He travelled by bicycle in the latter campaign, carrying a trailer and sleeping at campsites.  Beddome said that he wanted to raise awareness about clean modes of transportation as well as the problems faced by family farms.

Party leader

Beddome was elected to a two-year term as Manitoba Green Party leader on November 15, 2008, defeating incumbent Andrew Basham and third candidate Shane Nestruck. After his victory, he said that he would work toward running a full slate of candidates in the next provincial election. He was the party's candidate for a by-election in the northeast Winnipeg division of Elmwood in early 2009. In 2011, he ran as the party's candidate for Wolseley in the general election that year.

In 2013, Beddome stepped down as leader to focus on completing his articles of law after graduating from the faculty of law at the University of Manitoba. Alain Landry was appointed interim party leader for the Manitoba Greens in November 2013.

Beddome ran as a candidate in the party's 2014 leadership race, and was reelected as party leader in November 2014. In the 2016 and 2019 provincial elections he ran in Fort Garry-Riverview and then Fort Rouge. In the 2019 federal election, he ran in Winnipeg South Centre. Beddome had been planning on running for federal election in 2019 before Brian Pallister called the provincial elections early. He was prepared to retract his federal campaign and had a replacement candidate in place, should he have won the provincial seat but  Beddome did not win in either election.

Electoral record

References

External links
 
 Interview with James Beddome, Leader of the Green Party of Manitoba, CTV News (August 2019)

1983 births
Living people
Green Party of Canada candidates in the 2019 Canadian federal election
Leaders of the Green Party of Manitoba
Politicians from Brandon, Manitoba